Hakucho (also known as CORSA-b before launch; CORSA stands for Cosmic Radiation Satellite) was Japan's first X-ray astronomy satellite, developed by the Institute of Space and Aeronautical Science (then a division of the University of Tokyo). It was launched from the Kagoshima Space Center by the ISAS M-3C rocket on the M-3C-4 mission on February 21, 1979  and reentered the atmosphere on April 15, 1985.

Hakucho was a replacement for the CORSA satellite which failed to launch due to rocket failure on February 4, 1976.

Highlights 
Discovery of soft X-ray transient Cen X-4 and Aql X-1
Discovery of many burst sources
Long-term monitoring of X-ray pulsar (e.g. Vela X-1)
Discovery of 2 Hz variability in the Rapid Burster later named Quasi Period Oscillation.

See also

 Timeline of artificial satellites and space probes

References 

isas.jaxa.jp
heasarc.gsfc.nasa.gov

Satellites formerly orbiting Earth
X-ray telescopes
Satellites of Japan
1979 in spaceflight
Spacecraft launched in 1979